Heciul may refer to one of two places in Sîngerei District, Moldova:

Heciul Nou, a commune
Heciul Vechi, a village in Alexăndreni Commune